Amaurobius ruffoi is a species of spider in the family Amaurobiidae, found in Italy.

References

ruffoi
Spiders of Europe
Spiders described in 1990